The Black Madonna of Częstochowa, also known as Our Lady of Częstochowa, is a venerated icon of the Blessed Virgin Mary housed at the Jasna Góra Monastery in Częstochowa, Poland.

Pope Clement XI issued a Pontifical decree of canonical coronation to the image on 8 September 1717 via the Vatican Chapter. It has also merited three pontifical golden roses to date.

The icon

The painting (122 × 82 centimetres)  displays a traditional composition well known in the icons of Orthodox Christianity.  The Virgin Mary is shown as the "Hodegetria" version (meaning "One Who Shows the Way" or “Οδηγήτρια” in Greek). In it, Mary directs attention away from herself, gesturing with her right hand toward Jesus as the source of salvation. In turn, the child extends his right hand toward the viewer in blessing while holding a book of gospels in his left hand. The icon shows Mary in fleur-de-lis robes.

The origins of the icon and the date of its composition are still contested among scholars. One difficulty in dating the icon is due in part to its original image being painted over after being severely damaged by robbers in 1430. The wooden panel backing the painting was broken, and the image slashed. Medieval restorers unfamiliar with the encaustic method found that the paints they applied to the damaged areas "simply sloughed off the image", according to the medieval chronicler Risinius. Their solution was to erase the original image and repaint it on the original panel. The original features of an Orthodox icon were softened; the nose was made more aquiline.

History

Lucan tradition
The icon of Our Lady of Częstochowa has been intimately associated with Poland for the past 600 years. Its history before it arrived in Poland is shrouded in numerous legends that trace the icon's origin to Luke the Evangelist, who painted it on a cedar table top from the Holy Family house. The same legend holds that the painting was discovered in Jerusalem in 326 by Helena, who brought it back to Constantinople and presented it to her son, Constantine the Great.

Arrival in Częstochowa
The oldest documents from Jasna Góra state that the picture traveled from Constantinople via Belz. Eventually, it came into the possession of Władysław Opolczyk, Duke of Opole, and adviser to Louis of Anjou, King of Poland and Hungary. Ukrainian sources state that earlier in its history, it was brought to Belz with much ceremony and honors by King Lev I of Galicia and later taken by Władysław from the Castle of Belz when the town was incorporated into the Polish kingdom. A famous story tells that in late August 1384, Ladislaus was passing Częstochowa with the picture when his horses refused to go on. He was advised in a dream to leave the icon at Jasna Góra.

Art historians say that the original painting was a Byzantine icon created around the sixth or ninth century. They agree that Prince Władysław brought it to the monastery in the 14th century.

Our Lady declared as Queen and Protector of Poland

In August 1382, the hilltop parish church was transferred to the Paulites, a hermitic order from Hungary. The golden fleur-de-lis painted on the Virgin's blue veil parallel the heraldic azure, semée de lis, or of the French royal coat of arms and the most likely explanation for their presence is that the icon had been present in Hungary during the reign of either Charles I of Hungary or Louis the Great, the Hungarian kings of the Anjou dynasty. They probably had the fleur-de-lis of their family's coat of arms painted on the icon. This would suggest that the image was probably originally brought to Jasna Góra by the Pauline monks from their founding monastery in Hungary.

The Black Madonna is said to have miraculously saved the monastery of Jasna Góra (English: Bright Mount) from a Swedish invasion. The Siege of Jasna Góra took place in the winter of 1655 during the Second Northern War, as the Swedish invasion of the Polish–Lithuanian Commonwealth is known. The Swedes were attempting to capture the Jasna Góra monastery in Częstochowa. The sacred icon was replaced with a copy and the original moved in secret to the castle in Lubliniec, and later to the Pauline monastery in Mochów between the towns of Prudnik and Głogówek. Seventy monks and 180 local volunteers, mostly from the Szlachta (Polish nobility), held off 4,000 Swedes for 40 days, saved their sacred icon and, according to some accounts, turned the course of the war. This event led King John II Casimir Vasa to give what has become known as the Lwów Oath. He submitted the Polish Commonwealth under the protection of Our Lady and proclaimed her Queen of Poland in the cathedral of Lwów on April 1, 1656. Before this event, several royal nobilities have offered crowns to the image throughout the years, replacing its iron sheet crown riza with one in gold with several jewels. In later years, various gemstones were interchanged and repositioned around the image to preserve the icon's aesthetic by replacing the stolen crowns.

Legends about the Madonna's appearance

The legend concerning the two scars on the Black Madonna's right cheek is that the Hussites stormed the Pauline monastery in 1430, plundering the sanctuary. Among the items stolen was the icon. The Hussites tried to get away after putting it in their wagon, but their horses refused to move. They threw the portrait down to the ground, and one of the plunderers drew his sword upon the image and inflicted two deep strikes. When the robber tried to inflict a third strike, he fell to the ground and writhed in agony until his death. Despite past attempts to repair these scars, they had difficulty covering up those slashes as the painting was done with tempera infused with diluted wax.

Veneration
Częstochowa is regarded as the most popular shrine in Poland, with many Polish Catholics making a pilgrimage there every year. Since 1711, a pilgrimage leaves Warsaw every August 6 for the nine-day, 140-mile trek. Elderly pilgrims recall stealing through the dark countryside at great personal risk during the Nazi occupation. Pope John Paul II secretly visited as a student pilgrim during World War II.

The feast day of Our Lady of Częstochowa is celebrated on August 26.

Pontifical approbations

Several pontiffs have recognized the image:

 Pope Clement XI — issued a decree of Canonical Coronation for the image via the Vatican Chapter on 8 September  1717. It is the third image to merit a decree of pontifical coronation outside of Rome. The first one is the Madonna of Trsat in Croatia, followed by the Virgin of Mount Goritia in Slovenia. 
 Pope Pius X — after the crowns were stolen on 23 October  1909, the Pontiff replaced the crowns on 22 May  1910.
 Pope John Paul II — gifted another set of crowns as a native of Poland, placed on 26 August 2005.
 Three pontiffs have granted golden roses to the image, Pope John Paul II (1978), Pope Benedict XVI (2006), Pope Francis (2016).

Outside Poland
Orthodox Christian believers in Ukraine and Belarus as former parts of the Polish–Lithuanian Commonwealth. Ukrainians have a special devotion to the Madonna of Częstochowa. The icon is often mentioned in Ukrainian folk songs from the 16th and 17th centuries.

Our Lady of Czestochowa Roman Catholic Church in Houston, TX has a copy hanging inside the church to the left of the altar. This version of the icon does not have the heavily gilded gold over the initial image.

The American National Shrine of Our Lady of Czestochowa is located in Doylestown, Pennsylvania. Another shrine of the image is located in Garfield Heights, Ohio; erected on October 1, 1939, by the Sisters of St. Joseph of the Third Order of St. Francis.

In Australia, the Shrine of Our Lady of Mercy, Penrose Park, located in the Southern Highlands of New South Wales is dedicated to her honour. The title Our Lady of Mercy is used to remember all the times she has responded through history to prayers for protection.

Icon usage in the Haitian Vodou religion
Due to its Africanized image, the icon has been syncretized by some Vodou practitioners to the deity Ezilí Dantor, the main loa of the Petro family in Haitian Vodou. It is hypothesized that the image was introduced into Haiti by the reproductions of the Black Madonna brought by Polish soldiers who sided with the rebels during the Haitian Revolution.

See also
 Black Madonna
 Black Madonna Shrine, Missouri
 The Deluge, Swedish invasion
 Erzulie
 Ezili Dantor
 Jasna Góra Monastery
 National Shrine of Our Lady of Częstochowa
 Orthodox Church of the Icon of Our Lady of Częstochowa
 Our Lady of Częstochowa-St Casimir Parish
 Our Lady of Sorrows, Queen of Poland
Rainbow Madonna

References and sources

References

Sources

External links

 Jasna Góra
 Czestochowa.us
 Biographical entry of prof. dr Wojciech Kurpik, restorer of Black Madonna of Częstochowa (Polish Wikipedia)

 
Częstochowa
Shrines to the Virgin Mary
Catholic Church in Poland
Catholic devotions
The Most Holy Virgin Mary, Queen of Poland
National symbols of Poland
Eastern Orthodox icons of the Virgin Mary
Paintings of the Madonna and Child
Pauline Order
Angels in art
Books in art